Man Lai was a Chinese actress from Hong Kong. Lai is credited with over 630 films.

Early life 
In 1916, Lai was born in Wuzhou, Guangxi, China.

Career 
In 1952, Lai started her acting career. Lai debuted as a mother in Bride a la Mode, a 1952 comedy film directed by Chiang Wai-Kwong. Lai is known for her role as a mother or an aunt. Lai's last film was The Iron Fisted Monk, a 1977 martial arts film directed by Sammo Hung. Lai is credited with over 630 films.

Filmography

Films 
This is a partial list of films.
 1952 Bride a la Mode - Chi-Fung's mother
 1953 Spring - 3rd Uncle's wife.
 1954 Autumn - Cheung
 1955 Cold Nights - General's wife.
 1956 Madam Mei 
 1958 Marriage on the Rocks - Ng's mother 
 1961 How to Get a Wife
 1964 Pigeon Cage 
 1966 Spy with My Face - Chan's nurse maid.
 1967 A Gifted Scholar and a Beautiful Maid (aka Merry Maid) 
 1977 The Iron Fisted Monk - Liang's mother

Personal life 
Lai's son is Lau Wing. On April 4, 1983, Lai died in Hong Kong.

See also 
 Lai Cheuk-Cheuk

References

External links 
 Lai Man at hkcinemagic.com
 Lai Man at hkmdb.com

1916 births
1983 deaths
Chinese emigrants to British Hong Kong
Hong Kong film actresses
Actresses from Guangxi
People from Wuzhou